Jefferson Harcourt Jones (born 6 January 1954) is a Barbadian born former English cricketer.  Jones was a right-handed batsman who bowled right-arm fast-medium.  He was born at  Christ Church, Barbados.

Jones made his Minor Counties Championship debut for Berkshire in 1972 against Oxfordshire.  From 1972 to 1994, he represented the county in 161 Minor Counties Championship matches, the last of which came in the 1994 Championship when Berkshire played Wiltshire.  Jones also played in the MCCA Knockout Trophy for Berkshire.  His debut in that competition came in 1983 when Berkshire played Norfolk.  From 1983 to 1992, he represented the county in 13 Trophy matches, the last of which came when Berkshire played Buckinghamshire in the 1992 MCCA Knockout Trophy.

Additionally, he also played List-A matches for Berkshire.  His List-A debut for the county came against Hertfordshire in the 1976 Gillette Cup.  From 1976 to 1992, he represented the county in 11 List-A matches, with his final List-A match coming in the 1992 NatWest Trophy when Berkshire played Derbyshire at the County Ground, Derby.  In his 11 matches, he took 15 wickets at a bowling average of 35.60, with best figures of 4/35.

References

External links

1954 births
Living people
People from Christ Church, Barbados
English sportspeople of Barbadian descent
English cricketers
Berkshire cricketers